Indian Creek is a stream in Morgan County in the U.S. state of Missouri. It is a tributary to the Gravois Creek Arm of the Lake of the Ozarks.

Indian Creek was so named on account of Indian settlements near its course.

See also
List of rivers of Missouri

References

Rivers of Morgan County, Missouri
Rivers of Missouri